Tricin is a chemical compound. It is an O-methylated flavone, a type of flavonoid. It can be found in rice bran and sugarcane.

Glycosides 
 Tricin 4'-glucoside (Tricin-4'-O-beta-D-glucopyranaoside, CAS number 71855-50-0)
 Tricin 5-glucoside (Tricin 5-O-beta-D-glucopyranoside, CAS number 32769-00-9)
 Tricin 7-O-glucoside (Tricin 7-O-beta-D-glucopyranoside, CAS number 32769-01-0)

Biosynthesis 

The biosynthesis of flavones has not yet been elucidated in full; however, most of the mechanistic and enzymatic steps have been discovered and studied.  In biosynthesizing tricin, there is first stepwise addition of malonyl CoA via the polyketide pathway and p-coumaroyl Coa via the phenylpropanoid pathway.  These additions are mediated by the sequential action of chalcone synthase and chalcone isomerase to yield naringenin chalcone and the flavanone, naringenin, respectively. CYP93G1 of the CYP450 superfamily in rice then desaturates naringenin into apigenin.  After this step, it is proposed that flavonoid 3’5’-hydroxylase (F3’5’H) changes apigenin into tricetin.  Upon formation of tricetin, 3’-O-methyltransferase and 5’-O-methyltransferase adds methoxy groups to tricetin to form tricin.

Other compounds formed from tricin 
Three flavonolignans derived from tricin have been isolated from oats Avena sativa.

References 

O-methylated flavones
Resorcinols